This list of ancient peoples living in Italy summarises groupings existing before and during the Roman expansion and conquest of Italy. Many of the names are either scholarly inventions or exonyms assigned by the ancient writers of works in ancient Greek and Latin. In regard to the specific names of particular ancient Italian tribes and peoples, the time-window in which historians know the historical ascribed names of ancient Italian peoples mostly falls into the range of about 750 BC (at the legendary foundation of Rome) to about 200 BC (in the middle Roman Republic), the time range in which most of the written documentation first exists of such names and prior to the nearly complete assimilation of Italian peoples into Roman culture. Nearly all of these peoples and tribes spoke Indo-European languages: Italics, Celts, Ancient Greeks, and tribes likely occupying various intermediate positions between these language groups. On the other hand, some Italian peoples (such as the Rhaetians, Camuni, Etruscans) likely spoke non-Indo-European languages. In addition, peoples speaking languages of the Afro-Asiatic family, specifically the largely Semitic Phoenicians and Carthaginians, settled and colonized some coastal parts of Italy (particularly in insular Italy in western and southern Sardinia and western Sicily).

Before the widespread introduction of writing, and before ancient sources existed that describe ancient Italian tribes, archaeological cultures might be hypothesized to have been associated with historical identities, especially in relatively isolated and continuous regions. However, due to the lack of written documentation, any further assumptions as to the historical names or cultural identities of these proposed ancient archeological cultures and of those Italian peoples existing prior to known ancient written sources would be presumptuous by current archeological and historical standards. 

The specifically named ancient peoples of Italy listed here are therefore confined mostly to the Iron Age of Italy, when the first known written evidence, generally from Ancient Roman or Greek sources, ascribed names to these tribes or peoples before such peoples became assimilated into Roman culture through the Roman conquest. In contrast to those tribes or peoples documented by ancient sources, pre-Roman and pre-Iron Age archeological cultures are also listed, following the lists of specifically named ancient Italian peoples and tribes; however, the names of these pre-Roman archeological cultures are modern inventions, and most of the actual names of the peoples or tribes that belonged to these proposed cultures, if such names existed, currently remain unknown.

Speakers of non-Indo-European languages 

Scholars believe - though sometimes on the basis of scanty evidence - that the following peoples spoke non-Indo-European languages. Some of them were Pre-Indo-Europeans or Paleo-Europeans while, with regard to some others, Giacomo Devoto proposed the definition of Peri-Indo-European (i.e. everything that has hybrid characters between Indo-European and non-Indo-European).

Sardinians

The Sardinians were possibly Sherden.
Balares (Balari)
Ilienses/Iolaes/Diagesbes (Iliensi/Iolei)
Corsi (Possibly related to Ligures and therefore possibly Indo-European speakers)

Tyrrhenians

The Tyrrhenians were the Etruscans and their linguistic relatives.
Etruscans - Centered in Etruria with later influences stretching from the Po Valley to Campania.
Raeti
Camunni

Others (classification uncertain)
 North Picenes - Centered on the Adriatic Coast with settlements around the region of Ancona.
 Rutuli
 Sicani
 Ligures

Speakers of Indo-European languages 
Proto-Indo-Europeans

Italo-Celtic

Italic and Celtic languages are commonly grouped together on the basis of features shared by these two branches and no others. This could imply that they are descended from a common ancestor and/or Proto-Celtic and Proto-Italic developed in close proximity over a long period of time.

Italic 

Venetics
Latino-Faliscans
Latins/Romans - Centered around the central plain of Italy between the Tiber and the Alban Hills.
Falisci

Speakers of Italic languages are thought to have included,
Sicels
Adriatic Veneti - centered in the Po delta.
Carni
Catali
Catari
Histri
Liburnians
Lopsi
Secusses
Venetulani
Umbri - Centered in central Italy stretching from the Adriatic coast to the upper Tiber. 
Sabines - Centered north of Rome and by the river Tiber.
Marsi - Centered around Lake Fucinus
Volsci - Centered on the Pontine plain
South Picenes
Marrucini

Oscans - Centered in southern Italy by Cumae and Capua.
Opici
Aurunci/Ausones
Campanians - Centered in the region of Naples
Mamertines
Paeligni
Samnites - Centered in central Italy, south-east of Rome north of Capua.
Pentri
Caraceni
Caudini
Frentani - Centered on the southern Adriatic coast.
Hirpini
Lucani - Centered on the south-western coast of Italy.
Bruttii
Itali
Oenotri
Chones
Tauriani
Morgetes
Others
Aequi
Fidenates
Hernici
Vestini
Aborigines
Euganei

Celts 

The Celts of the Italian peninsula included,
Cisalpine Gauls - Centered in the Po Valley with influences stretching to Etruscan Felsina 
Boii
Carni
Cenomani
Lingones
Senones
Vertamocorii
Gaesatae?
Insubres
Arverni
Aedui
Ambarri
Aulerci
Bituriges
Carnutes

Lepontics
Graioceli
Lepontii
Salassi
Medulli
Ceutrones
Allobroges
Veragri
Helvetii
Seduni

Ligures 

The Ligures, who may have spoken Indo-european language of Celtic type or a non-Indo-european language, were:

Ligures
Apuani
Bagienni
Briniates
Friniates
Garuli
Hercates
Ilvates
Orobii
Laevi
Lapicini
Marici
Segusini
Statielli
Taurini

Greeks 

Sometimes referred in ancient sources as Pelasgi, the Ancient Greeks of the Italian peninsula included, 
Achaeans
Dorians
Ionians
Italiotes
Siceliotes

Others (classification uncertain)
Iapygians or Apulians (possibly related to Illyrians) - Centered on the southern Adriatic coast with settlements around Tarentum.
Messapians
Peucetians
Daunians
Elymians (possibly related to Ligures)

Pre-Roman conquest archeological cultures

The specific identities or names of the tribes or groups of peoples that practiced these pre-Roman archeological cultures are mostly unknown. The posited existence of these archeological cultures is based on archeological assemblages of artifacts that share common traits and are found within a certain region and originate within a certain prehistoric period. Therefore, many of these archeological cultures may not necessarily correspond to a specific group of ancient people and, in fact, may have been shared among various groups of ancient peoples. The extent to which an archeological culture is representative of a particular cohesive ancient group of people is open for debate; many of these cultures may be the product of a single ancient Italian tribe or civilization (e.g. Latial culture), while others may have been spread among different groups of ancient Italian peoples and even outside of Italy. For example, Latial culture is believed to be the product specifically of the Ancient Latin tribe; the Canegrate culture and Golasecca culture have been associated with various ancient proto-Celtic, Celtic and Ligure tribes including the Lepontii, Orobii, and Insubres, while other archeological cultures may have been present among multiple groups throughout and beyond the Italian peninsula.

Neolithic
Pre-Nuragic Sardinia
Cardial Culture
Grotta Verde culture
Filiestru culture
Bonu Ighinu culture
San Ciriaco culture
Arzachena culture
Ozieri culture
Gaudo culture

Copper Age
Pre-Nuragic Sardinia
Abealzu-Filigosa culture
Monte Claro culture
Sardinian Beaker culture
Beaker culture
Remedello culture
Rinaldone culture
 
Laterza culture
Gaudo culture
Conelle-Ortucchio culture
Serraferlicchio culture
Spilamberto group

Bronze Age
Apennine culture
Bonnanaro culture
Nuragic civilization
Torrean civilization
Canegrate culture
Proto-Villanovan culture
Polada culture
Castelluccio Culture
Thapsos Culture
Terramare culture
Castellieri culture
Luco-Meluno culture
Scamozzina culture

Iron Age
Hallstatt culture
La Tène culture
Villanova culture
Latial culture
Este culture
Golasecca culture
Camunni culture
Fritzens-Sanzeno culture

Genetics

A genetic study published in Science in November 2019 examined the remains of six Latin males buried near Rome between 900 BC and 200 BC. They carried the paternal haplogroups R-M269, T-L208, R-311, R-PF7589 and R-P312 (two samples), and the maternal haplogroups H1aj1a, T2c1f, H2a, U4a1a, H11a and H10. A female from the preceding Proto-Villanovan culture carried the maternal haplogroups U5a2b. These examined individuals were distinguished from preceding populations of Italy by the presence of ca. 25-35% steppe ancestry. Overall, the genetic differentiation between the Latins, Etruscans and the preceding proto-villanovan population of Italy was found to be insignificant.

See also 

 Prehistoric Italy
 Genetic history of Italy
 List of ancient Italic peoples
 List of Nuragic tribes
 History of Italy
 History of the Mediterranean region
 Etruscan civilization
 Pre-Nuragic Sardinia
 Nuragic civilization 
 Latins (Italic tribe)
 Prehistory of Corsica 
 Prehistory of Malta
 History of Sardinia
 History of Sicily
 List of Celtic tribes
 List of ancient Germanic peoples
 List of ancient Greek tribes
 List of ancient Iranian peoples
 Italo-Celtic
 Magna Graecia
 Rock Drawings in Valcamonica
 Osco-Umbrian languages
 Roman Kingdom
 Founding of Rome
 Aeneid
 Old Latium

References

Bibliography

External links 
 "Languages and Cultures of Ancient Italy. Historical Linguistics and Digital Models", Project fund by the Italian Ministry of University and Research (P.R.I.N. 2017)

 
Italy
Ancient
Ancient languages